Igor Kunitsyn and Dmitry Tursunov are the defending champions, but eventually they lost in the first round to Alex Bogomolov Jr. and Mikhail Kukushkin.
František Čermák and Filip Polášek won the title, defeating Carlos Berlocq and David Marrero 6–3, 6–1 in the final.

Seeds

Draw

Draw

References
 Main Draw

2011 Men's Doubles
Kremlin Cup - Doubles